A Better Version of Me is the third studio album by American indie rock band Rainer Maria.

Reception 

"Matured vocal power and solid song structure have replaced the cacophonous ways of their youth." - PopMatters
"Caithlin De Marrais' graceful, yet abrasive vocals craft the dynamic of the band..." - AllMusic

Track listing

Personnel

Caithlin De Marrais – group member
Kaia Fischer – group member
William Kuehn – group member
Elliot Dicks –  assistant engineer, mixing, assistant producer, assistant
Mark Haines – producer, engineer, mixing
Lesley Vance – cover painting
Mark Owens – artwork, design
Matt Owens – design

References

Rainer Maria albums
2001 albums